Nicholas Richards (born November 29, 1997) is a Jamaican professional basketball player for the Charlotte Hornets of the National Basketball Association (NBA). He played college basketball for the Kentucky Wildcats.

High school career

Born and raised in Kingston, Jamaica, Richards attended Jamaica College (JC) and competed in soccer, volleyball and track and field before being discovered by Andre Ricketts, a New York City-based basketball scout, in the summer of 2013 during a basketball camp in Jamaica. Ricketts brought him to the US, where Richards attended St. Mary's High School in Manhasset, New York. He transferred to The Patrick School in Hillside, New Jersey in 2014.

He was ranked a five-star recruit in the class of 2017 (by ESPN) and committed to the University of Kentucky in November 2016. He was UK’s first commit in the class of 2017 and chose Kentucky over Syracuse and Arizona.

Richards played in the 2017 McDonald's All-American Boys Game, scoring two points, grabbing two rebounds and tallying two blocked shots in 14 minutes of action. Participating in the 2017 Jordan Brand Classic, he had ten points and three boards in 16 minutes of play. Richards was picked to play for the World Select Team at the 2017 Nike Hoop Summit. He saw 19:29 minutes of action during the game, scoring 12 points and grabbing three rebounds.

College career
Richards had then-career-highs of 25 points and 15 rebounds on November 22, 2017, contributing to the Wildcats' 86–67 win over IPFW. He averaged  5.1 points and 4.4 rebounds per game as a freshman but saw his playing time decrease as the season went on. Richards posted 3.9 points and 3.3 rebounds per game as a sophomore and led the team in blocks. Following the season he declared for the 2019 NBA draft but opted to return to Kentucky. On November 8, 2019, Richards scored 21 points and grabbed 10 rebounds as Kentucky defeated Eastern Kentucky 91–49. He had 21 points, 12 rebounds and four blocks on January 4, 2020, in a 71–59 win over Missouri. Richards had 25 points including the two clinching free throws and 13 rebounds on January 25, in a 76–74 overtime win over Texas Tech. On February 4, Richards set a new career-high with 27 points on an 80–72 win over Mississippi State. At the conclusion of the regular season, Richards was named to the First Team All-SEC. He averaged 14 points, 7.8 rebounds, and 2.1 blocks per game. Following the season, Richards declared for the 2020 NBA draft.

Professional career
In the 2020 NBA draft, Richards was selected by the New Orleans Pelicans (42nd overall) and immediately traded to the Charlotte Hornets in exchange for a second-round pick in 2024. On November 30, 2020, he signed a contract with the Hornets. Richards was assigned to the Greensboro Swarm and made his NBA G League debut on February 21, 2021, scoring 26 points and grabbing 10 rebounds.

Career statistics

NBA

|-
| style="text-align:left;"| 
| style="text-align:left;"|Charlotte
| 18 || 0 || 3.5 || .444 || .000 || .636 || .6 || .1 || .0 || .0 || .8
|-
| style="text-align:left;"| 
| style="text-align:left;"|Charlotte
| 50 || 5 || 7.3 || .667 ||  || .698 || 1.7 || .3 || .2 || .4 || 3.0
|- class="sortbottom"
| style="text-align:center;" colspan="2"|Career
| 68 || 5 || 6.3 || .646 || .000 || .685 || 1.4 || .2 || .1 || .3 || 2.4

College

|-
| style="text-align:left;"| 2017–18
| style="text-align:left;"| Kentucky
| 37 || 37 || 14.7 || .616 || – || .718 || 4.4 || .2 || .1 || .9 || 5.1
|-
| style="text-align:left;"| 2018–19
| style="text-align:left;"| Kentucky
| 37 || 3 || 12.1 || .598 || – || .690 || 3.3 || .2 || .1 || 1.3 || 3.9
|-
| style="text-align:left;"| 2019–20
| style="text-align:left;"| Kentucky
| 31 || 30 || 29.6 || .642 || – || .752 || 7.8 || .2 || .1 || 2.1 || 14.0
|- class="sortbottom"
| style="text-align:center;" colspan="2"| Career
| 105 || 70 || 18.2 || .627 || – || .728 || 5.0 || .2 || .1 || 1.4 || 7.3

References

External links
Kentucky Wildcats bio

1997 births
Living people
Centers (basketball)
Charlotte Hornets players
Greensboro Swarm players
Jamaican expatriate basketball people in the United States
Jamaican men's basketball players
Kentucky Wildcats men's basketball players
McDonald's High School All-Americans
New Orleans Pelicans draft picks
The Patrick School alumni
Sportspeople from Kingston, Jamaica